Cnemaspis molligodai, commonly known as Molligoda's day gecko, is a species of diurnal lizard in the family Gekkonidae. The species is endemic to the island of Sri Lanka.

Etymology
The specific name, molligodai, is in honor of Sri Lankan Hayasinth Molligoda for his service and commitment to the conservation of the amphibians and reptiles of Sri Lanka.

Description
Adult males of C. molligodai measure  in snout–vent length (SVL).

Reproduction
C. molligodai is oviparous.

References

Further reading
Mendis Wickramasinghe LJ, Munindrdasa DAI (2007). "Review of the genus Cnemaspis Strauch, 1887 (Sauria: Gekkonidae) in Sri Lanka with the description of five new species". Zootaxa 1490: 1-63. (Cnemaspis molligodai, new species, p. 9).

Cnemaspis
Reptiles described in 2007
Reptiles of Sri Lanka
Endemic fauna of Sri Lanka